Twenty-Fourth Air Force / Air Forces Cyber (AFCYBER) was a Numbered Air Force within the United States Air Force. The Air Force consolidated its cyberspace combat and support forces into 24 AF. 24 AF was the Air Force component of U.S. Cyber Command.

On 11 October 2019, the 24th AF was merged with the 25th AF to form a reactivated 16th Air Force.

Formation
The 24AF was originally intended to be a part of the now-defunct Air Force Cyber Command; however, 24AF became a component of Air Force Space Command on 18 August 2009.

In August 2008, then-Air Force Chief of Staff Gen. Norton A. Schwartz placed a stop order suspending implementation of Air Force Cyber Command, halting personnel assignments and unit activations. On 6 October 2008, following its annual Corona conference, the Air Force announced Air Force Cyber Command activation would not take place, and that a Numbered Air Force, 24AF, would gain the cyber warfare mission as part of Air Force Space Command.

One key element under 24 AF is the Air Force's primary network warfare wing, the 67th Cyberspace Wing, headquartered at Joint Base San Antonio-Lackland, Texas. The new NAF also gained:

 The 688th Cyberspace Wing – JBSA-Lackland, Texas
 The 689th Combat Communications Wing (now inactivated) – Robins Air Force Base, Georgia
 The 624th Operations Center (taking over duty and personnel of the 608th Air Force Network Operations Center) – JBSA-Lackland, Texas
 Although now administratively aligned under Air Combat Command, the Air Force Network Integration Center (formerly Air Force Communications Agency), works closely with 24AF on its mission to build and sustain Air Force networks.

Over 14,000 Airmen make up 24 AF. Many of these are in place at other organizations. Air Force units also host cyber specialists from other organizations. Before the 24 AF was activated, the Air Force had announced six possible locations for its headquarters: Barksdale AFB, LA; Lackland AFB, TX; Langley AFB, VA; Offutt AFB, NE; Peterson AFB, CO; and Scott AFB, IL.

On 15 May 2009, Air Force officials announced Lackland as the preferred alternative, and the decision was confirmed on 12 August 2009. The organization officially stood-up on 18 August 2009. On 22 January 2010, 24AF was certified by AFSPC/CC for its Initial Operational Capability. Full Operational Capability was declared on 1 October 2010.

History 
In 2014, 24 AF provided the Cyber Mission Force for the Exercise Red Flag for the first time. During U.S. Strategic Command's Exercise Global Lightning 14, 24AF operated as a Joint Force Headquarters-Cyber in support of a combatant commander during a large joint exercise for the first time. 
Twenty-Fourth Air Force was reassigned to Air Combat Command on 17 July 2018.

Units
624th Operations Center, Lackland AFB
67th Cyberspace Wing, Lackland AFB
67th Cyberspace Operations Group, Lackland AFB
67th Operations Support Squadron, Lackland AFB
91st Cyberspace Operations Squadron, Lackland AFB
315th Cyberspace Operations Squadron, Ft. Meade
352d Network Warfare Squadron, JBPHH
390th Cyberspace Operations Squadron, Lackland AFB
318th Cyberspace Operations Group, Lackland AFB
39th Information Operations Squadron, Hurlburt Field
90th Cyberspace Operations Squadron, Lackland AFB
318th Operations Support Squadron, Lackland AFB
346th Test Squadron, Lackland AFB
567th Cyberspace Operations Group, Scott AFB
92d Cyberspace Operations Squadron, Lackland AFB
833d Cyberspace Operations Squadron, Lackland AFB
834th Cyberspace Operations Squadron, Lackland AFB
836th Cyberspace Operations Squadron, Lackland AFB
835th Cyberspace Operations Squadron, Scott AFB
837th Cyberspace Operations Squadron, Scott AFB
688th Cyberspace Wing, Lackland AFB
688th Operations Support Squadron, Lackland AFB
5th Combat Communications Group, Robins AFB
5th Combat Communications Support Squadron, Robins AFB
51st Combat Communications Squadron, Robins AFB
52d Combat Communications Squadron, Robins AFB
26th Cyberspace Operations Group, Lackland AFB
26th Network Operations Squadron, Maxwell AFB
26th Operations Support Squadron, Lackland AFB
33d Network Warfare Squadron, Lackland AFB
68th Network Warfare Squadron, Lackland AFB
426th Network Warfare Squadron, Lackland AFB
38th Cyberspace Engineering Installation Group, Tinker AFB
38th Contracting Squadron, Tinker AFB
38th Cyberspace Readiness Squadron, Tinker AFB
38th Engineering Squadron, Tinker AFB
38th Operations Support Squadron, Tinker AFB
85th Engineering Installation Squadron, Keesler AFB
690th Cyberspace Operations Group, Lackland AFB
83d Network Operations Squadron, Langley AFB
561st Network Operations Squadron, Peterson AFB
690th Intelligence Support Squadron, Lackland AFB
690th Network Support Squadron, Lackland AFB
690th Cyberspace Operations Squadron, JBPHH
691st Cyberspace Operations Squadron, Ramstein AB

List of commanders

See also
 List of cyber warfare forces

References

External links
 Air Force Reserve Command
 Twenty-Fourth Air Force revised structure
 24th Air Force Website
 Maj Gen Suzanne M. Vautrinot

24
United States Cyber Command
Military units and formations established in 2009
2009 establishments in the United States
Military units and formations in Texas